Urap (sometimes spelled urab or in its plural form urap-urap) is a salad dish of steamed vegetables mixed with seasoned and spiced grated coconut for dressing. It is commonly found in Indonesian cuisine, more precisely Javanese cuisine. Urap can be consumed on its own as a salad for vegetarian meals or as a side dish. Urap is usually found as a prerequisite side dish of Javanese tumpeng, a cone shaped rice mound surrounded with assorted dishes, as well as part of a nasi kuning dish. In Balinese cuisine it is known as Urab sayur.

Ingredients
The vegetables which are usually used in urap are spinach, water spinach, young cassava leaf, papaya leaf, Chinese longbeans, bean sprouts and cabbage. To acquire a rich taste, most recipes insist on using freshly shredded old coconut flesh or serundeng, instead of leftover. The shredded coconut is seasoned with ground shallot, garlic, red chilli pepper, tamarind juice, galangal, salt and coconut sugar.

See also

 Lawar, a Balinese version of urap
 Gado-gado
 Karedok
 Pecel
 Plecing kangkung
 Kuluban
 List of steamed foods

References

External links
 Urap recipe from Asian food recipe
 Urap recipe from petit chef
 Urap recipe from Original Indonesian recipe
 Resep Urap Urap - Indonesian spicy salad in Youtube

Salads
Vegetable dishes of Indonesia
Vegetarian dishes of Indonesia
Foods containing coconut
Steamed foods